David Oliver "D. J." Jones (born January 19, 1995) is an American football nose tackle for the Denver Broncos of the National Football League (NFL). He played college football at Ole Miss. Jones was drafted by the San Francisco 49ers in the sixth round of the 2017 NFL Draft.

College career
After impressive years throughout high school, Jones was heavily recruited for football by colleges throughout the U.S.

Jones began his college career at the East Mississippi Community College in Scooba, Mississippi, the school that was featured in the 2016 Netflix documentary "Last Chance U". As a two-year starter during his two seasons, Jones helped guide East Mississippi to a perfect 24–0 record and two NJCAA national championships. In 2013, as a freshman, he played in 12 games and registered 49 tackles, 8.0 sacks, 5.0 TFLs and 1 FF. As a sophomore, he earned MACJC all-region and all-state honors and recorded 29 tackles, 4.0 sacks, 8.5 TFLs, and 2 FFs in 12 games. Prior to transferring, Jones was listed as the No. 3 junior college prospect in the country by 247sports.com and ESPN.com.

He transferred to the University of Mississippi for the 2015 season. After transferring, Jones immediately became one of the strongest Rebels. According to NFL.com, he benched 440 pounds, squatted 650 pounds and had a max clean of 330 pounds when he finished his time at East Mississippi Community College.

In two seasons at Ole Miss, Jones played in 25 games, with 15 starts, and registered 70 tackles, 6.0 sacks, 8.5 TFLs, 1 INT, 1 FF, 1 FR, and 1 PD. In 2016, as a senior, he started all 12 games and tallied 30 tackles, 2.0 sacks, 3.0 TFLs, 1 INT, and 1 FR. As a junior, he played in 13 games, starting three of them, and notched 40 tackles, 4.0 sacks, 5.5 TFLs, and 1 FF.

Professional career

San Francisco 49ers
Jones was drafted by the San Francisco 49ers in the sixth round, 198th overall, in the 2017 NFL Draft. Jones is a big part of the defensive line rotation and a stalwart against the run. He’s improved every year, with the analytic website Pro Football Focus noting his grade against the run has improved every season, from 57.5 as a rookie to 63.9 in 2018. He was in on 13 percent of defensive snaps in 2017 and 22 percent last season. On October 27, 2019, Jones got his first career sack on Kyle Allen of the Carolina Panthers.

In 2019, Jones started 11 games before suffering a high ankle sprain in Week 14. He was placed on injured reserve on December 14, 2019.

Jones was placed on the reserve/COVID-19 list by the team on November 23, 2020, and activated on December 2.

Jones re-signed with the 49ers on a one-year contract on March 22, 2021.

Denver Broncos
On March 17, 2022, Jones signed a three-year, $30 million contract with the Denver Broncos.

Personal life 
On October 7, 2019, Jones and his girlfriend, Kayla Fannin, got engaged on the field at Levi’s Stadium in the hours leading up to the kickoff against the Cleveland Browns. Jones decided to pop the question to his girlfriend, Kayla Fannin, ahead of the San Francisco 49ers Monday Night Football. Fannin and family gathered on the sidelines for pregame photos when Jones distracted his girlfriend and dropped to a knee behind her. The emotional affair was featured on the video boards across Levi's Stadium. 

In 2020, Jones announced, on Instagram, his marriage to Kayla and wedding pictures were posted.

References

External links
Ole Miss Rebels bio

1995 births
Living people
Sportspeople from Greenville, South Carolina
Players of American football from South Carolina
American football defensive tackles
East Mississippi Lions football players
Ole Miss Rebels football players
San Francisco 49ers players
Denver Broncos players